The MV Queen of New Westminster is a Canadian roll-on, roll-off passenger ferry operated by BC Ferries.

In 1964, the vessel was built as one of seven Victoria class ferries. Like her sister ships, she was lengthened in 1973 at Burrard Dry Dock. After the ship damaged a crankshaft beyond repair, she was re-engined with four Wärtsilä engines, had the car deck platform ramps removed and was raised to add a second car deck at Vancouver Shipyards in 1991. After being raised for a second car deck, she would normally be considered a Victoria class ferry as she shares most of the characteristics of that class, but because of her improved powerplants and higher clearance car decks, she is unique. Her two former sister ships are the Burnaby class vessels Queen of Nanaimo and Queen of Burnaby, which are also not considered Victoria class vessels because they did not receive the additional car deck which created the final Victoria class ferries.

Though her four Victoria class sister ships were all scrapped by 2012, she had a major refit of her passenger areas between late 2007 and early 2009 to prepare her for another ten to fifteen years of service.

Structural refits
In 1973 the ship was cut in half to enable an additional 25-meter section to be inserted at a cost of $2.5 million and in 1991 she underwent a major rebuild including new engines and an additional car deck at a cost of $35.6 million.

Accidents

In October, 1971, Queen of New Westminster pulled out of her berth at the Departure Bay terminal while vehicle loading was in progress. A car and its two occupants fell into the water.  Both of the vehicle's occupants were rescued.

In a similar incident, on August 13, 1992, the ship pulled out of her berth at the Departure Bay terminal while vehicle loading ramps were still lowered and resting on the ship.  Three people were killed, one was seriously injured, and two others received minor injuries when a van from Alberta containing 6 people fell  from the upper deck onto the lower car deck and finally into the sea below. The van was stopped and instructed to wait on the loading ramp by terminal crew members. The Transportation Safety Board of Canada determined that this accident was caused primarily by the vessel not properly following departing procedures and secondarily due to poor communication between terminal and ship crew members.

Sister ships

Queen of New Westminster initially had six sister ships, none of which are still in service with BC Ferries. These ships were originally built as a single class but were modified through different combinations of deck-stretching, addition of more vehicle decks, and installation of more powerful engines. Though New West is a sister of these ships, the ship does not fit into either the V class or the Burnaby class.

 Victoria Class ferries (all scrapped)
 Queen of Victoria
 Queen of Vancouver
 Queen of Esquimalt
 Queen of Saanich
 Burnaby Class ferries
 Queen of Nanaimo (retired)
 Queen of Burnaby (retired)

References

External links
BC Ferries Corporation: Queen of New Westminster Ship Page
Queen of New Westminster Fan Page archive from February 2008

Ships of BC Ferries
Ships built in British Columbia
1964 ships
V-class ferries